Karelius August Arntzen (10 November 1802 – 1876) was a Norwegian jurist, civil servant and politician.

He was born in Copenhagen, where his father Andreas Arntzen took his jurist education. 
He became a student at the University of Copenhagen in 1820.  In 1824 he was employed as copyist in the Ministry of Justice. In 1827, he  graduated  cand.jur. and took his law degree. In 1831 he became bureau chief and in 1833 expedition secretary.

He was later County Governor of Søndre Trondhjems Amt (now Sør-Trøndelag) from 1840 to 1857 and of Christiania (Oslo) from 1857 to 1874. 
He was appointed acting councillor of state in the interim government which was founded during the illness of King Carl XV during August 1861, but did not actually assume office. He died in 1876.

References

1802 births
1876 deaths
County governors of Norway
19th-century Norwegian people
19th-century Norwegian politicians
University of Copenhagen alumni
19th-century Norwegian lawyers